Jonas Žemaitis (also known under his nom de guerre Vytautas; March 15, 1909 in Palanga – November 26, 1954 in Moscow) was one of the leaders of the Lithuanian partisans, armed resistance against the Soviet occupation of Lithuania, and acknowledged as the head of state by independent Lithuania.

Biography
Žemaitis was born to Jonas Žemaitis and Petronėlė Daukšaitė. Despite the fact that his father was non-religious, Žemaitis was christened in Palanga's church. From 1910 to 1917, he lived with his parents in Łomża, Poland, where his uncle A. Daukša owned a large dairy farm. In Łomża, Žemaitis attended a primary school while his parents were working. In 1917, Žemaitis returned to Lithuania and settled down in the village of Kiaulininkai, near Šiluva, where his grandparents lived. In 1921, he finished first class at the Raseiniai Gymnasium. In 1926, started studying at the War School of Kaunas. In 1929, he finished this school and became a lieutenant. Žemaitis started his military service with the 2nd Artillery Battery as a commander. In 1936–1938, Žemaitis studied at the School of Applied Artillery in Fontainebleu, France. After his studies, Žemaitis was promoted to captain and commanded artillery units of the Lithuania military forces.

After the Soviet occupation of Lithuania in June 1940, Žemaitis continued his active service in the 617th Artillery Regiment, where he was the head of the regiment's school. At the beginning of the war between the Soviet Union and Nazi Germany, Žemaitis was at the proving ground of Varėna. After receiving the order to retreat to the east, Žemaitis and a group of soldiers consciously fell behind and surrendered to the Germans. He did not want to serve the Nazis, and therefore he retired and settled down in Kaunas. He worked as a technician of peat extraction.

In 1944, he joined the Lithuanian Territorial Defense Force, organized by Povilas Plechavičius. After the force was disbanded by the Nazis, Žemaitis went into hiding. When the Red Army returned to Lithuania, Žemaitis joined the Lithuanian Freedom Army and the Lithuanian partisans, steadily rising to a position of leadership. In February 1949, he established the Union of Lithuanian Freedom Fighters and became its chairman; he worked to continue partisan resistance to Soviet occupation and legitimize the actions of the partisans. In December 1951, he suffered a cerebral hemorrhage and became paralyzed. In May 1953, his place of hiding was discovered by Soviet agents and he was arrested. After being transported to Moscow, he was interrogated by Lavrentiy Beria and was executed in the Butyrka prison in 1954.

Posthumous fate
With the independence of Lithuania, Žemaitis was recognized as a national hero of Lithuania. A monument to Žemaitis was erected in Vilnius near the Lithuanian Ministry of Defense; there is also a monument to the general in Palanga.

Jonas Žemaitis is the namesake of the General Jonas Žemaitis Military Academy of Lithuania. In 1995 a documentary Ketvirtasis Prezidentas (The Fourth President) was released about his life. Posthumously Jonas Žemaitis-Vytautas was awarded the rank of brigadier general and was officially named as the fourth President of Lithuania in March 2009.

References

 

1909 births
1954 deaths
Lithuanian generals
Lithuanian people executed by the Soviet Union
Lithuanian partisans
Lithuanian independence activists
Lithuanian anti-communists